Sydney Street ferry wharf is located on the northern side of the Brisbane River serving the Brisbane suburb of New Farm in Queensland, Australia. It is served by RiverCity Ferries' CityCat and CityHopper services.

History 
The wharf was destroyed during the January 2011 Brisbane floods. A temporary replacement opened on 18 April 2011.

The temporary wharf closed in January 2015 to allow a new permanent wharf to be built. The new wharf opened on 6 May 2015.

References

External links

Ferry wharves in Brisbane
New Farm, Queensland